The Holy Martyrs of Lazeti, also known as Three Hundred Laz Martyrs (Laz: სუმოში ლაზი თისჲაფე, sumoşi lazi tisyape) are saints of the Georgian Orthodox Church, who were put to death for not renouncing Christianity by the Ottoman Empire between the years 1600 and 1620. The Georgian church commemorates them on 18 September (O.S. 10 October).

References

Source
 Zakaria Machitadze (2006). "Lives of the Georgian Saints". St. Herman Press, P.O. Box 70, Platina, CA 96076

1600 deaths
1620 deaths
17th-century Christian saints
17th-century Eastern Orthodox martyrs
Ethnic groups in Turkey
 
Christians executed for refusing to convert to Islam
Christian saints killed by Muslims
Saints of Georgia (country)
Murder in 1600
Murder in 1620
Murder in the 1600s
Murder in the 1610s
Massacres in 1620